The IWI Tavor TAR-21 is an Israeli bullpup assault rifle chambered in 5.56×45mm NATO caliber with a selective fire system, selecting between semi-automatic mode and full automatic fire mode. The Tavor is designed and produced by Israel Weapon Industries (IWI). It is produced in two main variants: the TAR-21 and the CTAR-21.

Built around a long-stroke piston system (as found in the M1 Garand and AK-47), the Tavor is designed to maximize reliability, durability, simplicity of design, and ease of maintenance, particularly under adverse or battlefield conditions.

In 2009, the Tavor X95 (also known as the Micro Tavor or MTAR) was selected by the Israeli Defense Forces to gradually replace the M16 assault rifle and M4 carbine variants as the standard-issued weapon of the Israeli infantry by the end of 2018. The first X95 bullpup rifles were issued to infantry units in 2013. Both the TAR-21 and X95 are part of the Tavor family of rifles, along with the Tavor 7.

In the beginning of September 2021, there were conflicting reports in Israeli media whether the IDF was planning to end further acquisition of the Tavor and Micro and replace it with M4s for front-line units. On 7 September, a report was published on the IDF's Hebrew website that the IDF plans to continue acquiring the Micro Tavor and equipping combat units with it.

History

Israel Military Industries (the small arms branch of IMI was privatized into Israel Weapon Industries) initiated the Tavor development team in 1995, under the direction of gun designer Zalmen Shebs.

The objective of the project was to create an assault rifle that was more reliable, durable, and easier to maintain than the M4A1 carbine, while also being better suited to close-quarters combat and mechanized infantry roles. As a result, they hoped that the weapon would be officially adopted by the Israel Defense Forces.

Due to the military's close-quarters and mechanized infantry requirements, the project team selected a bullpup design that would allow the weapon to be compact while keeping a long barrel able to achieve ballistically favorable high muzzle velocities. A long-stroke piston system, similar to that found in the AK-47 and M1 Garand, was selected to ensure the weapon's reliability under adverse conditions.

Trials and use in Israel
The Tavor prevailed over the M4A1 in a series of trials conducted during 2001 and 2002. Qualities tested included Mean Rounds Between Failures (MRBF), reliability, ergonomics during long marches, and ease-of-maintenance.

As part of initial testing by Israel Defense Forces' infantry units, the TAR-21 was distributed to members of the training company of the Tzabar Battalion from the Givati Brigade who were drafted in August 2001. They received their rifles in November 2001 during basic training. Initial testing results were favorable – the TAR-21 was found to be significantly more accurate and reliable (as well as more comfortable) than the M4 during extensive field testing.

Issues with fine sand entering the Tavor's chamber, which were identified over the two years of testing, were rectified by numerous small adjustments. A number of other improvements and changes to the design were also made between 2001 and 2009. The Tavor CTAR-21 saw combat service in Operation Cast Lead, used by Givati Brigade and Golani Brigade, and the soldiers reported the Tavor bullpup assault rifles functioned flawlessly.

In November 2009, the IDF announced that the X95 would become the standard infantry weapon of the IDF, with the addition of an integrated grenade launcher. 
A gradual changeover has begun in 2006 and expected completion among front line troops was to be by the end of 2018.

In December 2012, the IDF announced that they would begin equipping and training their new reserve forces with the X95, starting in 2013, with the switch-over by the end of 2018.

The first Tavor X95s were issued to new recruits of a main IDF infantry brigade in 2013, replacing the M16.
In 2014 the IDF announced that in the future (from as early as the end of 2014) some infantry units could start to be issued some numbers of an improved X95, which will have a longer  barrel (instead of the original 33 cm barrel) and a lighter trigger pull.

On 5 September 2021, it was reported by the Israel Hayom newspaper's website that Israeli front-line infantry units have begun replacing their Tavor and Micro Tavor Rifles with M4s and that the Tavor rifles in existing inventory will be transitioned to reserve brigades. However, on 8 September, the IsraelDefense website reported that the IDF plans to continue acquiring the Micro Tavor, quoting from a report posted on the IDF's Hebrew website on 7 September regarding a multi-year plan. The rifle is to be distributed to combat troops of relevant units in upcoming rounds of recruitment. The weapons division of the Ground Forces Command was quoted as saying that it's "very satisfied by its capabilities... the rifle performs very well and has proven itself."

Design

Bullpup configuration
The Tavor uses a bullpup configuration, in which the receiver, bolt carrier group, and magazine are placed behind the pistol grip. This shortens the firearm's overall length without sacrificing barrel length. As a result, the Tavor provides carbine overall length, yet can achieve rifle muzzle velocities if equipped with a rifle-length barrel.

Long-stroke piston system
The Tavor uses a non-lubricated long-stroke piston system, as found in the M1 Garand, IMI Galil, and the AK-47. Like in the AK-47, the long-stroke piston mechanism contributes to the extreme forcefulness of the TAR-21's extraction and chambering. The Tavor's attachment of the piston to a heavy bolt carrier, and the extension of the mainspring into the hollow stem of the bolt carrier, bears a familiar resemblance to the internal mechanism of the AK-47.

Ambidexterity and modularity
The Tavor has ejection ports on both sides of the rifle so it can easily be reconfigured for right or left-handed shooters. However, this process requires partial disassembly, so it cannot be quickly reconfigured while the rifle is in use. An issue related to this is the original plastic cover on the unused ejection can allow gas to escape during the course of fire. Due to the bullpup design, this vents right under the shooter's face, causing issues such as inhaling ejection gases and the fouling of glasses and face with ejection debris. The issue is exacerbated when the weapon is suppressed. The characteristic black smudge from this has been nicknamed "Tavor face" by some shooters. This has been addressed by various non-factory solutions which increase sealing of the unused port.

Its ambidextrous fire mode selector above the pistol grip has a semi-automatic mode and a fully automatic mode.

The Tavor features a self-contained, drop-in trigger group so that the trigger group can be changed or replaced without the use of additional tools.

The Tavor can also be mounted with the M203 grenade launcher (GTAR-21).

Chambering, cartridges and ammunition feeding

The Tavor is primarily chambered in 5.56×45mm NATO, although 9×19mm Parabellum and 5.45×39mm Russian models are also available.

The IDF uses both  M193 and  M855 5.56×45mm rounds. M193 rounds are used by regular infantrymen for better terminal effects at shorter distances, while the heavier M855 is used by sharpshooters.

The Tavor accepts standard STANAG magazines.

Last round bolt-open catch
The Tavor features a last round bolt catch, whereby the bolt holds open after the last round discharges. This is a request of modern armies, as it helps to allow soldiers to know when their magazine empties and to reduce reloading times during combat while also not requiring manual action cycling after.

Barrel
Tavor barrels are made from CrMoV steel and cold-hammer-forged (CHF) on the premises of the IWI factory in Ramat HaSharon. The TAR-21 barrel is 18 inches (457 mm) in length and is chrome-lined for durability and corrosion resistance. The barrel features 6 grooves in a 1 in 7 inch (178 mm) twist, or 32 calibers right hand twist rate.

The barrel is fitted with a 'birdcage' style flash suppressor, which can be fully disassembled without the need for additional tools.

Reliability, ease-of-maintenance and waterproofing
The design objectives of the Tavor aimed for reliability and ease-of-maintenance, particularly under adverse or battlefield conditions. According to Russell C. Tilstra, the Tavor is "easily considered more reliable" than the M16 and M4 series rifles.

The Tavor is designed to be easily field-stripped, without the need for any additional tools.

It is waterproofed and its internal mechanism is sealed from outside elements, so that it can pass over-the-beach requirements.

Variants

TAR-21
The Tavor TAR-21 is the standard variant with a 457 mm (18 in) long barrel.

The Israeli firearm manufacturer, Israel Weapon Industries produces the Tavor TAR-21 in different variations:

GTAR-21
The GTAR-21 has a notched barrel, to accept an M203 40 mm under-barrel grenade launcher.

CTAR-21
The CTAR-21 is a compact shorter 380 mm (15 in) barrel variant intended for commandos and special forces, but has become more favored than the standard TAR-21 throughout the IDF.

STAR-21
The STAR-21 is a designated marksman variant with folding under-barrel bipod and Trijicon ACOG 4× magnification sight

Tavor X95 (MTAR-21)

The Tavor X95 (also referred to as the MTAR-21) is the variant of the Tavor that was selected as the future standard infantry weapon of the IDF in 2009. In 2013, the X95 was issued for the first time as the standard infantry weapon to recruits of the Givati Brigade.

With the use of a relatively simple conversion kit, the X95 can be converted from a 5.56 mm assault rifle to a 9 mm submachine gun. A suppressor can also be added to the weapon, as part of the 9 mm conversion kit. A grenade launcher can also be attached to the X95.

Tavor 7

The IWI Tavor 7 is the latest iteration of the Tavor. It is chambered in 7.62×51 mm NATO. It is a fully ambidextrous rifle.
 Tavor 7. The Tavor 7 is the base variant of this rifle, with a 432 mm (17 in) long barrel, and 730 mm (28.7 in) overall length.
 20" Barrel A designated marksman rifle variant, however yet to be separately designated, that is equipped with a 508 mm (20 in) barrel and has an 806 mm (31.7 in) overall length

Ukrainian licensed Tavors
Ukraine purchased a license for Tavors to be manufactured by Ukrainian firearm manufacturer RPC Fort. As of March 2021, Fort is no longer marketing them.

 Fort-221 – Ukrainian locally produced version of the CTAR-21 in 5.45×39 mm.
 Fort-222 – Ukrainian locally produced version of the STAR-21 in 5.45×39 mm.
 Fort-223
 Fort-224

TC-21

The semi-automatic Tavor Carbine (TC-21) was first made available for civilian customers to purchase in Canada from 2008. The Canadian civilian version initially shipped with the Mepro reflex sight and a slightly longer barrel to meet the Canadian requirement for non-restricted semi-automatic centerfire rifles to have a barrel length of at least 470 mm. Current versions are shipped with a full-length Picatinny rail, without optics. In Europe, the Czech company Zeleny Sport recently (December 2015) imported Israeli-made TC-21s, equipped with Mepro M5 or M21 reflex sight, which are now available for both civilian and law enforcement customers.

In 2013, IWI started a US subsidiary, IWI US, which is manufacturing the semi-automatic TC-21 as the Tavor SAR for U.S. sales. The weapon is manufactured with a combination of Israeli and US parts. IWI US had shipped 50,000 Tavor SARs to US civilian customers by early 2016.

IWI US sells the Tavor SAR in variety of variants:

 TSB16: Semi-automatic version of the CTAR-21, with a 26.125 in (663.575 mm) overall length.
 TSB16L: A TSB16 with left-handed controls pre-installed.
 TSB16-BLK: A TSB16 chambered in .300 AAC Blackout.
 TSB17-9: 9×19 mm submachine gun with a 17 in (431.8 mm) barrel and a 26.125 in (663.575 mm) overall length.
 TSB18: 5.56×45 mm rifle with an 18 in (457.2 mm) barrel and a 27.625 in (701.675 mm) overall length.
 TSB18RS: 5.56×45 mm rifle with an 18 in (457.2 mm) barrel and a 30 in (762 mm) overall length; integrated permanent  in muzzle brake and a 10-round magazine to be compliant with laws of certain states. ("RS" stands for Restricted State.)
 TSIDF16: Semi-automatic version of the CTAR-21 without a full-length rail, an integrated MEPRO 21 sight, and a 26.125 in (663.575 mm) overall length; meant to be a semi-automatic replica of the CTAR-21 issued to the IDF.
Note: IWI US sells their Tavor SARs in a variety of colors, including Black (B), Flat Dark Earth (FD), and OD Green (G); the letter "B" subsequent to "TS" in the rifles' designations can be switched with any of the colors' respective letters.

Aftermarket parts
A significant aftermarket of spare and replacement parts has developed around the Tavor, including the development of match grade accurizing triggers for the bullpup rifle that are produced by manufacturers such as Geissele Automatics and double stage trigger pack TAV-D from Shooting Sight.

Shlomi Sabag, Deputy CEO of IWI, says that one of the indicators of the success of the rifle in the shooting sports or civilian market is the fact that "an aftermarket of products associated with the Tavor bullpup rifle, like triggers, has evolved very quickly".

Awards
The Truth About Guns website awarded the Tavor with TTAG Reader's Choice Award for Best Rifle of 2013.

The National Rifle Association's American Rifleman awarded the Tavor the 2014 Golden Bullseye Award as its rifle of the year. The NRA's prestigious award, now in its twelfth year, aims to award the best products available to civilian shooters.

The Tavor X95 was awarded the NRA's rifle of the year award for 2017.

Users

 : Angolan Army purchase for Special Forces.
 : Azerbaijan purchased a number of TAR-21 for the special operations forces of the Azerbaijani Army in August 2008.
 : Produced under license by Taurus for the military, but as of 2017, Taurus has never carried out a licensed production of the Tavor. Small numbers are issued to soldiers in the Frontier Brigade.
 : Issued to the Special Forces of Cameroon Army.
 : Issued to Chadian Ground Forces since 2006.
 : Used by special forces and the National Police of Colombia.
 : Investigations Police of Chile.
: The Tavor Χ95 assault rifle is used by Cypriot Special Forces. 
 
 : Different variants of the weapon have been acquired and issued to law enforcement, special commando and protection units of the Georgian MIA since 2001. In 2004 the TAR-21 was to replace the Soviet Kalashnikov rifle, however due to lack of funding and low purchase quantity that idea was abandoned. The construction of a manufacturing plant was also considered.
 : Guatemala's police force or PNC (Policia Nacional Civil) operates the TAR-21.
: Honduran Army and special forces operate the Tavor X95.
 : In late 2002, India signed an  deal with Israel Military Industries for 3,070 manufactured TAR-21s to be issued to India's special forces personnel, where its ergonomics, reliability in heat and sand might give them an edge at close quarters and deployment from inside vehicles. By 2005, IMI had supplied 350–400 TAR-21s to India's northern Special Frontier Force (SFF). These were subsequently declared to be "operationally unsatisfactory". The required changes have since been made, and tests in Israel during 2006 went well, clearing the contracted consignment for delivery. The TAR-21 has now entered operational service – even as India gears up for a larger competition that could feature a 9 mm X95 version. There was an attempt to create an Indian version of the Tavor under license known as Zittara, which was not adopted and it was made with a few prototypes from OFB. The new Tavor X95s have a modified single-piece stock and new sights, as well as Turkish-made MKEK T-40 40 mm under-barrel grenade launchers. 5,500 have been recently inducted and more rifles are being ordered. In 2016, IWI announced that it was establishing a 49:51 joint venture with Punj Lloyd in India, in order to manufacture rifle components in India.
 : Used by BRIMOB Police Special Forces.
: Used by Ivorian Special Forces.
 : See: Trials and Use in Israel
 
 : In service with the Ministry of Public Security since 2011.
 : Special forces.
 : General Directorate for National Security equipped with the Tavor X95. The first Arab or North African country to use the Tavor publicly.
 : The State Security Service employ it as the primary assault rifle for their close protection and tactical units replacing the Uzi. Adopted by the Nigerian Navy and the Nigerian Air Force Regiment as their main assault rifle.
 : Used by Rapid Deployment Unit (Tar-21) and Special Anti-terrorist Unit – Tiger (Tavor x95) .
 
 : Small quantities in use by special units of the Philippine Marines and Philippine Drug Enforcement Agency and one PNP SWAT team in Pasig.
 : Small quantities of the TAR-21 are in use by field and intervention units of the Polícia Judiciária, like hostage negotiation teams and investigators who usually work alongside other dedicated law enforcement intervention units—the Special Operations Group (GOE) and the National Republican Guard's Special Operations Company (COE); these weapons were initially intended to equip a new unit under the command of the Polícia Judiciária resembling the GOE. The TAR-21 also participated in the competition for the new service rifle for the three branches of the Portuguese Armed Forces and the Police Special Operations Group (GOE)—a bid that also included the local production of the TAR-21 in Portugal. However, the TAR-21 was excluded from the shortlist. The competition has meanwhile been annulled, after the other contenders and both political and defense critics accused the competition of favoring the Heckler & Koch G36.
 
 : Issued to the Special Forces of the Senegal Army.
 : To replace some of its current inventory of M16A1 assault rifles, the Royal Thai Army purchased three batches of TAR-21 bullpup assault rifles for US$27.77 million (THB 946.99 million) and approved delivery of a fourth batch with total number of 13,868 rifles at US$27,777,604 US (THB 964,993,963 at the exchange rate of 34.74 THB/USD)  on 15 September 2009, bringing the total to more than 76,000 TAR-21s.
: Used by Special Forces Command in executive protection role.
 
 : Yuriy Lutsenko, then head of Ministry of Internal Affairs of Ukraine, announced on October 1, 2008 that Israel Weapon Industries and the Ukrainian research and production company RPC Fort would jointly manufacture Tavor bullpup assault rifles to enter service with special Ukrainian military and police units. RPC Fort had displayed working samples of Tavors chambered in 5.45×39mm cartridge with Milkor 40mm UBGL grenade launchers to showcase to Ukrainian security forces officers as a means of convincing them to buy Ukrainian-made Tavors for special forces units. In December 2009, a resolution was adopted to purchase the Fort 221 chambered in 5.45x39 for Ukrainian intelligence/border guard agencies, purchased in small numbers. It was subsequently adopted in 2014 for Ukrainian military and police forces also in 5.45 caliber. Known users include Ukrainian Spetsnaz forces and the Scorpion unit.
 : In August 2013, IWI US announced that the Pennsylvania Capitol Police had adopted the Tavor SAR, a variant specifically designed for the U.S. market. In July 2014, it was announced that the Lakewood, New Jersey Police Department would begin to adopt the Tavor SAR, after the weapon "met the demands and requirements of the Lakewood PD for reliability, ease-of-maintenance, durability and accuracy". The Hidalgo County Sheriff's Office in Texas, operate Tavor SAR.
 : On 13 October 2021, it was reported that the Uruguayan Ministry of the Interior acquired some 200 Tavor X-95s, manufactured by IWI, for the Uruguayan National Republican Guard Directorate. Training was carried out by an instructor from IWI, brought especially to Uruguay for that purpose. The Uruguayan police also purchased thousands of Tavor rifles from IWI.
 : From 2012, the TAR-21 entered service in special units of the Vietnamese Army, equipping special forces, naval infantries and navy personnel.
 : Used by the Zambian Army Special Forces Group.

See also
IWI Tavor X95
IWI Tavor 7
IWI Tavor TS12

References

External links

 Israel Weapon Industries (I.W.I.): TAVOR TAR-21 5.56 mm (TAVOR TAR FLATTOP)
 Israel Weapon Industries (I.W.I.): Micro TAVOR MTAR-21 5.56 mm / 9×19 mm
 YouTube Video: Overview of the civilian semi-automatic version of the Tavor
 YouTube Video: Water Tests of the Micro Tavor (X95)
 Tavor Israeli Weapons: The TAR-21 Tavor bullpup assault rifle
 Modern Firearms
 Decidedly Different: The IWI TAVOR , American Rifleman, National Rifle Association, USA

5.56 mm assault rifles
Long stroke piston firearms
Rifles of Israel
Bullpup rifles
Israeli inventions
Designated marksman rifles
Weapons and ammunition introduced in 2001